The following is a list of county roads in Nassau County, Florida.  All county roads are maintained by the county in which they reside.

County routes in Nassau County

References

FDOT Map of Nassau County
FDOT GIS data, accessed January 2014

 
County